= Lapithe =

Lapithe (Ancient Greek: Λαπίθη) was a town in ancient Thessaly. It is unlocated.
